Drunk History Australia is an Australian educational comedy television series based on the American series of the same name, which is in turn based on the web series Funny or Die.

Description
In each episode, an inebriated celebrity struggles to recount a historical event, while actors reconstruct and enact the narrator's anecdotes while lip syncing the dialogue.

In addition to celebrity guest stars, the show's characters are played by regulars such as David Collins, Yvie Jones, Cameron Knight,  Adam Dunn, Sara West, Greta Lee Jackson, Aaron Chen, Paul Ayre, Lana Kington, Harry Keep, Seaton Kay-Smith, Bruce Guo, Emma Thompson and Hamish Adams-Cairns.

Production
A pilot was commissioned in 2018 by Network Ten for Pilot Week, in which a 30-minute pilot episode aired along with several other new show pilots. The episode featured stories about Ned Kelly and Phar Lap and was presented by comedians Stephen Curry & Rhys Darby.

The first season was commissioned in 2019 by Network Ten and was released prematurely on 27 March 2020 on their streaming service 10 Play, prior to its official premiere on 14 September 2020.

Series overview

Episodes

Pilot

Series 1 (2020)

Controversy
The pilot drew mostly positive reviews, but some viewers were unhappy that the show seemed to glamourise excessive binge drinking in a country which has an extensive history of drinking problems.

References

External links
 
 

2010s Australian comedy television series
2018 Australian television series debuts
2020 Australian television series endings
2020s Australian comedy television series
Adult education television series
Australian television series based on American television series
Australian television sketch shows
English-language television shows
Fiction with unreliable narrators
Network 10 original programming
Storytelling television shows
Television series based on Internet-based works
Television series by Eureka
Television series featuring reenactments
Television shows set in Melbourne
Television shows set in Sydney